Bernard P. Zeigler (born March 5, 1940, in Montreal) is a Canadian engineer, and emeritus professor at the University of Arizona, known for inventing  Discrete Event System Specification (DEVS) in 1976.

Zeigler received his BA in engineering physics in 1962 from McGill University, his M.S.E.E. from MIT in 1964, and his PhD in computer and communication science in 1969 from the University of Michigan. He started his academic career in 1969 as associate professor at the University of Michigan. From 1975 to 1980 he was faculty member of the Weizmann Institute of Science in Rehovot, Israel. Back in the States in 1980 he was visiting for a year at the University of Michigan, and full professor at the Wayne State University in Detroit. And finally in 1985 he became professor of Electrical and Computer Engineering at the University of Arizona, and since its foundation in 2001 also Director of the Arizona Center for Integrative Modeling and Simulation.

In 1995 Zeigler was awarded IEEE Fellow in recognition of his contributions to the theory of discrete event simulation, and in 2000 he received the McLeod Founder's Award by the Society for Computer Simulation, also for his contributions to discrete event simulation.

Publications 
Books, a selection:
 1968. On the Feedback Complexity of Automata Ph.D. Thesis. University of Michigan 
 1976. Theory of Modeling and Simulation. Wiley Interscience, New York (1st. Ed. 1976)
 1979. Simulation and model-based methodologies: an integrative view. With Tuncer Őren and M.S. Elzas. Springer-Verlag New York, Inc.
 1984. Multifacetted Modeling and Discrete Event Simulation. Academic Press, London; Orlando 
 2000. Theory of Modeling and Simulation. 2nd Edition, With Tag Gon Kim and Herbert Praehofer. Academic Press, New York.
 2018. Theory of Modeling and Simulation. 3rd Edition, With Alexandre Muzy and Ernesto Kofman. Academic Press, New York.
 2020. Value-based Learning Healthcare Systems: Integrative modeling and simulation. With Mamadou Kaba Traore, Gregory Zacharewicz and Raphaël Duboz, IET. 

Articles, a selection
 1987. "Hierarchical, modular discrete-event modelling in an object-oriented environment." Simulation. Vol 49 (5). p. 219-230
 2006. "A Modular Verification Framework using Finite and Deterministic DEVS", with M.H. Hwang in: Proceedings of 2006 DEVS Symposium, pp. 57–65, Huntsville, Alabama, USA,
 2009. "Reachability Graph of Finite and Deterministic DEVS Networks", with M.H. Hwang in: IEEE Transactions on Automation Science and Engineering, Volume 6, Issue 3, 2009, pp. 454–467

References

External links 
 Bernard P. Zeigler at scs.org
 Guide to the Bernard P. Zeigler Papers 1962-2017

1940 births
Living people
Canadian engineers
Systems engineers
University of Michigan College of Engineering alumni
McGill University alumni
University of Arizona faculty
Wayne State University faculty
Canadian expatriates in Israel
Canadian expatriates in the United States
MIT School of Engineering alumni
Fellow Members of the IEEE